Project Gutenberg Canada, also known as Project Gutenburg of Canada, is a Canadian digital library founded July 1, 2007 by Dr. Mark Akrigg. The website allows Canadian residents to create e-texts and download books, including those that are otherwise not in the public domain in other countries. 

It is not formally affiliated with the original Project Gutenberg, though both share the common objective of making public domain books available for free to the general public as e-books. Project Gutenburg Canada primarily focuses on works by Canadian authors or about Canada, as well as works in Canadian French.

Distributed Proofreaders Canada began contributing ebooks to Project Gutenberg Canada when launched on December 1, 2007.

Canadian public domain

In Canada, the copyright period for works is 50 years after the year the author has died. Therefore, if the book was published during the author's lifetime and the author died 51 years ago or more, the book is in the Canadian public domain. Project Gutenberg Canada has received permission to redistribute books still under copyright in some cases.

Some authors whose works have entered the public domain in Canada and are thus available on Project Gutenberg Canada are A. A. Milne, Walter de la Mare, Sheila Kaye-Smith, Amy Carmichael, Gertrude Lawrence, Marshall Broomhall, Lilias Trotter, Laura Ingalls Wilder, Isobel Kuhn, and George Orwell.

Anti-CUSMA sentiment
In response to the signing and ratification of the Canada–United States–Mexico Agreement (CUSMA), which changed the Canadian copyright from 50 years to 70 years after the author's death, the following message appeared on the website's main page:

See also
Project Gutenberg
Project Gutenberg Australia
 Open access in Canada

References

External links
 

 

Canadian digital libraries
2007 establishments in Canada
Internet properties established in 2007
Intellectual property activism